Mireille Alcantara is a soprano and singing teacher both at the Conservatoire de Paris and the École Normale de Musique de Paris.

She has had several known singers as students: Karine Deshayes, Delphine Haidan, Tatiana Probst, among others.

She is the founder president of the Festival de musique Gloriana in the Var department.

References

External links 
 Alcantara Mireille on the site of the École normale de musique
 XVIII ème Festival Gloriana (YouTube)

Year of birth missing (living people)
Living people
Place of birth missing (living people)
Conservatoire de Paris alumni
Academic staff of the Conservatoire de Paris
École Normale de Musique de Paris alumni
Academic staff of the École Normale de Musique de Paris
French sopranos
Women music educators